Michael or Mike Wise may refer to:

 Michael Wise (musician) (1648–1687), English organist/composer
 Michael John Wise (1918–2015), British geographer
 Mike Wise (American football) (1964–1992), American football defensive end
 Mike Wise (columnist), American sports columnist and feature writer for The Washington Post
 Mike Wise (politician), former member of the Ohio House of Representatives
 Mike Wise (record producer), Canadian music producer, songwriter, and engineer

See also 
 Wise (surname)